Claire Louise Wright (born 5 August 1979 in Camberley, England) is a British trampoline gymnast. Her parents, Bernie and Colin Wright are gymnastics coaches and they run the Rushmoor Gymnastics Academy. She attended sixth form at Farnham College before doing a Sports Science degree at University of Wales Institute, Cardiff.

Wright received FIG pin for achievement at World Championships in 2000.

Wright retired after representing Great Britain at the 2008 Summer Olympics

Claire is currently performing in Cirque du Soleil's La Nouba, in the trampolining and track act.

Titles 
 British Champion 2001, 2002, 2003, 2004, 2005
 World Championships 2001, bronze medallist team and individual.
 Nine times World Cup Synchro Champion.
 World Cup Final 1st 2002. Synchro
 World Cup individual Champion 2002, Canada.
 World Cup Individual Champion 2004, Moscow
 World Cup Individual Champion 2005, Sofia

References

External links
 
 
 

1979 births
Living people
British female trampolinists
Olympic gymnasts of Great Britain
Gymnasts at the 2008 Summer Olympics
People from Camberley
World Games silver medalists
Competitors at the 2001 World Games
Medalists at the Trampoline Gymnastics World Championships
21st-century British women